Austinville is a hinterland locality in the City of Gold Coast, Queensland, Australia.

Geography 
Austinville covers approximately 20 kilometres squared and is situated in the Gold Coast Hinterland between Mudgeeraba and Springbrook.

Austinville is located in a valley through which flows Mudgeeraba Creek and the rugged Nimmel Range looms in the distance. Significant rainforest exists in the area.  Areas in the south are protected within Springbrook National Park.

History 
Austinville settlement was established as a banana plantation in 1934, making it one of the Gold Coast's oldest suburbs. It was started as an attempt to resettle unemployed people on the land following the Great Depression, and therefore lift the economy. It was named after Under-Secretary  for Labour at the time, William Henry Austin, who encouraged the building of many of these plantations throughout the state. Land was cleared and divided into blocks and 50 or so small homes were built too. Mudgeeraba Creek flowed behind the homes along the valley floor, and the rugged Nimmel Range bordered on the settlement's western side. The settlement was very short lived. By 1939, within just 5 years, most families had left the area. Rainforest has crept back into much of the once banana farming valley, and the area remains dwarfed by the surrounding conservation area.

Austinville State School opened on 25 June 1934 and closed on 9 June 1939.

See also

Suburbs of the Gold Coast

References

External links

  — includes Austinville

Suburbs of the Gold Coast, Queensland
Localities in Queensland